Werckmeister v. American Tobacco Co., 207 U.S. 375 (1907), was a United States Supreme Court case in which the Court held a copyright holder is limited to one action to collect infringing copies and statutory damages because the act's remedies are penal and must be observed without construction. Additionally, The United States is not required to be a party to copyright infringement litigation.

The Copyright Act of 1870 does not specify what sort of action a litigant must bring to remedy copyright infringement. Werckmeister won an infringement claim against American Tobacco Company and United States Marshalls collected the infringing copies from the company. Werckmeister took American Tobacco Company back to court to get the monetary damages enumerated by the Copyright Act. In the United States, a successful penal (criminal) suit may collect property and money as restitution. Because the Court determined that the infringement damages were penal, Werckmeister had the opportunity to collect the property, as they did, and the money. They were thus limited to only one action to collect both property and money, because the statute only provided for one action.

References

External links
 

1907 in United States case law
United States copyright case law
United States Supreme Court cases
United States Supreme Court cases of the Fuller Court